The 2021 Louisville Cardinals baseball team represented the University of Louisville during the 2021 NCAA Division I baseball season. The Cardinals played their home games at Jim Patterson Stadium as a member of the Atlantic Coast Conference. They were led by head coach Dan McDonnell, in his 15th season at Louisville.

Previous season

The 2020 Louisville Cardinals baseball team notched a 13–4 (2–1) regular season record. The season prematurely ended on March 12, 2020 due to concerns over the COVID-19 pandemic.

2020 MLB Draft
The Cardinals had three players drafted in the 2020 MLB draft.

Personnel

Roster

Coaching Staff

Game log

Rankings

2021 MLB draft

References

External links 
 Louisville Cardinals baseball

Louisville Cardinals
Louisville Cardinals baseball seasons
Louisville Cardinals baseball